Events from the year 1618 in Denmark.

Incumbents
 Monarch – Christian IV

Events
 November 16 – The first Danish voyage to India departs from Copenhagen under the command of Ove Giedde.

Births

Deaths

References

 
Denmark
Years of the 17th century in Denmark